Yahwism is the name given by modern scholars to the religion of ancient Israel. Yahwism was essentially  polytheistic, with a plethora of gods and goddesses. Heading the  pantheon was Yahweh, the national god of the Israelite kingdoms of Israel and  Judah, with his consort, the goddess Asherah, and second-tier gods and goddesses such as Baal, Shamash, Yarikh, Mot, and Astarte, each of whom had their own priests and prophets and numbered  royalty among their devotees. 

The practices of Yahwism included festivals, sacrifices, vow-making, private rituals, and  the adjudication of legal disputes. Contrary to the picture presented in the Hebrew Bible, the Temple in Jerusalem was not the sole, or even central, temple of Yahweh, but the king was the head of the national religion and thus the viceroy on Earth of the national god, a role reflected each year when he presided over a ceremony enthroning Yahweh in the Holy Temple in Jerusalem. 

Yahwism underwent several redevelopments and recontextualizations, as the notion of divinities aside from or comparable to Yahweh was gradually degraded by new religious currents and ideas. During the monarchic period ( 10th to 6th centuries BCE) of the mid-Iron Age, the religion of Israel moved towards the  sole worship of Yahweh alone; however, these theological changes initially remained largely confined to small groups, only spreading to the population at large during the widespread political turbulence of the 7th and 6th centuries BCE. The progressive evolution towards monotheism had ultimately culminated by the end of the Babylonian exile in the late 6th century BCE, and by the 4th century BCE, Yahwism had coalesced into what is now known as Second Temple Judaism. Yahwism also gave rise to Samaritanism.

History 
The centre of ancient Israel's religion through most of the monarchic period was the worship of a god named Yahweh, and for this reason the religion of Israel is often referred to as Yahwism. Yahweh, however, was not the 'original' god of Israel; it is El, the head of the Canaanite pantheon, whose name forms the basis of the name "Israel", and none of the Old Testament patriarchs, the tribes of Israel, the Judges, or the earliest monarchs, have a Yahwistic theophoric name (i.e., one incorporating the name of Yahweh). It is unclear how, where, or why Yahweh appeared in the Levant; even his name is a point of confusion. The exact date of this occurrence is also ambiguous: the term Israel first enters historical records in the 13th century BCE with the Egyptian Merneptah Stele, and while the worship of Yahweh is circumstantially attested to as early as the 12th century BCE, there is no attestation or record of even Yahweh's name, let alone his origin or character, in the Levant until some four hundred years later, with the Mesha Stele (9th century BCE). Nevertheless, many scholars believe that the shared worship of Yahweh played a role in the emergence of Israel in the Late Bronze Age (circa 1200 BCE). 

This early Israel was a society of rural villages, but in time urban centers grew up and society became more structured and more complex, and in the 9th century BCE Israel was founded as a kingdom with its capital at Samaria. After the 10th century BCE the tribes and chiefdoms of Iron Age I were replaced by ethnic nation states. In each kingdom, the king was also the head of the national religion and thus the viceroy on Earth of the national god. In Jerusalem this was reflected each year when the king presided over a ceremony at which Yahweh was enthroned in the Holy Temple. The Hebrew Bible gives the impression that the Jerusalem Temple was always meant to be the central, or even sole, temple of Yahweh, but this was not the case, and was not accepted as such in either the Kingdom of Israel, or the province of Samaria. The earliest known Israelite place of worship is a 12th-century open-air altar in the hills of Samaria featuring a bronze bull reminiscent of Canaanite "Bull-El" (El in the form of a bull), and the archaeological remains of further temples have been found at Dan on Israel's northern border, at Arad and  Beersheba in the Negev desert, once part of Judah. Shiloh, Bethel, Gilgal, Mizpah, Ramah, and Dan were also major sites for festivals, sacrifices, vow-making, private rituals, and the adjudication of legal disputes.

During an era of religious syncretism, it became accepted among the Israelite people to consider the Canaanite god El as the same as Yahweh. El was soon thought to have always been the same deity as Yahweh, as evidenced by Exodus .

The worship of Yahweh alone began at the earliest with prophet Elijah in the 9th century BCE, and at the latest with prophet Hosea in the 8th; even then it remained the concern of a small party before gaining ascendancy in the exilic and early post-exilic period. The early supporters of this faction are widely regarded as being monolatrists rather than true monotheists, since instead of believing that Yahweh was the only god in existence, they believed that he was the only god the people of Israel should worship, a noticeable departure from the traditional beliefs of the Israelites nonetheless. It was during the national crisis of the Babylonian Exile that the followers of Yahweh went a step further and finally denied that the other deities aside from Yahweh even existed, thus marking the transition from monolatrism to true monotheism, and from Yahwism to Judaism. Certain scholars date the start of widespread monotheism to the 8th century BCE, and view it as a response to Neo-Assyrian aggression.

In 539 BCE, Babylon fell to the Persians, ending the Babylonian exile. A number of the exiled Israelites, though probably not the majority, returned to Jerusalem. As descendants of the original exiles, they had never lived in Judah; nevertheless, in the view of the authors of the Biblical literature, they, and not those who had remained in the land, were "Israel". Judah, now called Yehud, was a Persian province, and the returnees, with their Persian connections in Babylon, secured positions of authority. Though they represented the descendants of the old "Yahweh-alone" movement, the religion they came to institute was significantly different from monarchic Yahwism; differences included new concepts of priesthood, a new focus on written law and thus on scripture, and a concern with preserving purity by prohibiting intermarriage outside the community of this new "Israel". This new faith represented the next stage in Judaism's development; Second Temple Judaism.

Beliefs and practices

Pantheon

There is a broad consensus among modern scholars that the religion of ancient Israel was basically polytheistic, involving a plethora of gods and goddesses. The supreme god was Yahweh, whose name appears as an element on personal seals from the late 8th to the 6th centuries BCE. Alongside Yahweh was his consort Asherah, (replaced by the goddess "Anat-Yahu" in the temple of the 5th century Jewish settlement Elephantine in Egypt), and various biblical passages indicate that statues of the goddess were kept in Yahweh's temples in Jerusalem, Bethel, and Samaria. 

Below Yahweh and Asherah were second tier gods and goddesses such as Baal, Shamash, Yarikh, Mot, and Astarte, all of whom had their own priests and prophets and numbered royalty among their devotees. A goddess called the "Queen of Heaven" was also worshiped: she was probably a fusion of Astarte and the Mesopotamian goddess Ishtar, although the phrase is possibly a title of Asherah.

A third tier may also have existed, made up of specialist deities such as the god of snakebite-cures – his name is unknown, as the biblical text identifies him only as Nehushtan, a pun based on the shape of his representation and the metal of which it was made – and below these again was a fourth and final group of minor divine beings such as the mal'ak, the messengers of the higher gods, who in later times became the angels of Christianity, Judaism and Islam, and other heavenly beings such as cherubim.

Worship of Baal and Yahweh coexisted in the early period of Israel's history, but they were considered irreconcilable after the 9th century BCE, following the efforts of King Ahab and his queen Jezebel to elevate Baal to the status of national god, although the cult of Baal did continue for some time.

Worship

The practices of Yahwism were largely characteristic of other Semitic religions of the time, including festivals, sacrifices, vow-making, private rituals, and the adjudication of legal disputes. The center of Yahweh-worship lay in three great annual festivals coinciding with major events in rural life: Passover with the birthing of lambs, Shavuot with the cereal harvest, and Sukkot with the fruit harvest. They became linked to events in the national mythos of Israel: Passover with the exodus from Egypt, Shavuot with the law-giving at Sinai, and Sukkot with the wilderness wanderings. The festivals thus celebrated Yahweh's salvation of Israel and Israel's status as his holy people, although the earlier agricultural meaning was not entirely lost.

Animal sacrifices played a big role in Yahwism and Judaism (prior to the destruction of the Second Temple in 70 CE) on altars, with the subsequent burning and the sprinkling of their blood, a practice described in the Bible as a daily Temple ritual for the Jewish people. Sacrifice was presumably complemented by the singing or recital of psalms, but the details are scant. The rituals detailed in Leviticus 1–16, with their stress on purity and atonement, were actually followed only after the Babylonian exile and the Yahwism/Judaism transition. In reality, any head of a family was able to offer sacrifice as occasion demanded. Prayer itself played little role in practice.

Prophets and heroes
In addition to the sacrificial priests, a great role in Yahwism, and still later Judaism, was played by prophets and epic heroes, reflected in the modern Jewish texts by legends about Samson and Joshua. Worship was performed on literal high places, with the Jerusalem Temple sitting on Mount Moriah/Mount Zion (hence, the Temple Mount), and the Samaritans' temple sitting on Mount Gerizim, although this may just be more of a coincidence than an intentional practice. Talismans and the mysterious teraphim were also probably used. It is also possible Yahwism employed ecstatic cultic rituals (compare the biblical tale of David dancing naked before the Ark of the Covenant) at times where they became popular, and possibly human sacrifice.

See also
 Canaanite religion
 Henotheism
 Monolatry
 Monotheism
 Origins of Judaism

Notes

References

Citations

Bibliography 

 
 
 
 
 
 
 

 
 
 
 
 
 
 
 
 
 
 
 
 
 
 
 .
 
 
 
 
 
 
      
 
 
 
 
 
 
 
 
 
 
 
 
 
 
 .
 
  

Ancient Israel and Judah
Ancient Semitic religions
Ancient Jewish history
Canaan
Judeo-Christian topics
Levantine mythology
Polytheism
Theism